Yohannan IV was Patriarch of the Church of the East from 900 to 905.

Sources 
Accounts of Yohannan's patriarchate are given in the Ecclesiastical Chronicle of the Jacobite writer Bar Hebraeus (floruit 1280) and in the ecclesiastical histories of the Nestorian writers Mari ibn Suleiman (twelfth-century), Amr (fourteenth-century) and Sliba (fourteenth-century)

Yohannan's patriarchate 
Bar Hebraeus devoted two paragraphs to Yohannan's patriarchate:

The caliph issued a decree that the bishops should be free to choose whomever they wished as their leader, and Yohannan bar Isa was consecrated at Seleucia on the fifth feast day of the year 287 of the Arabs (AD 900/1).  He was a man revered for his knowledge and continence.  In his days the metropolitan Theodore of Beth Garmaï was detected in fornication and deposed.

The catholicus Yohannan, after he had fulfilled his office for nearly five years, died in the year 292 [AD 904/5].  The story goes that he never took a bribe for the laying on of hands, and led a life of very great poverty.  When he was about to die he said to his disciple, 'Behold, I have 260 zuzae of silver hidden away in such and such a place, which were bequeathed to me by my parents.  Take them, and spend them on my funeral.

See also
 List of patriarchs of the Church of the East

Notes

References
 Abbeloos, J. B., and Lamy, T. J., Bar Hebraeus, Chronicon Ecclesiasticum (3 vols, Paris, 1877)
 Assemani, J. A., De Catholicis seu Patriarchis Chaldaeorum et Nestorianorum (Rome, 1775)
 Brooks, E. W., Eliae Metropolitae Nisibeni Opus Chronologicum (Rome, 1910)
 Gismondi, H., Maris, Amri, et Salibae: De Patriarchis Nestorianorum Commentaria I: Amri et Salibae Textus (Rome, 1896)
 Gismondi, H., Maris, Amri, et Salibae: De Patriarchis Nestorianorum Commentaria II: Maris textus arabicus et versio Latina (Rome, 1899)

External links 

Patriarchs of the Church of the East
10th-century bishops of the Church of the East
Nestorians in the Abbasid Caliphate